Brookwood Hills is a historic neighborhood located in intown Atlanta, Georgia, United States, north of Midtown and south-southwest of Buckhead.  Home to about 1000 people, it was founded in the early 1920s by Benjamin Franklin Burdett and his son, Arthur.  The site of the neighborhood is located where some of the bloodiest battles of the American Civil War took place during the Atlanta Campaign.

Location

Brookwood Hills is located near the heart of Atlanta, only a few miles away from the skyscrapers of its major business districts.  It is connected by three entrances to Peachtree Road, and has no other outlet.  Brookwood Hills is bordered roughly by Peachtree on the west, Interstate 85 on the south, the Norfolk Southern and MARTA tracks (just south of Peachtree Creek) to the north, and Clear Creek to the east.

The Brookwood neighborhood, for which Brookwood Hills was named, is located immediately southwest of the southern tip of Brookwood Hills.  This is in turn immediately north of the major freeway interchange called the "Brookwood split", which joins I-75 to the northwest and I-85 to the northeast into the Downtown Connector to the south.

The Brookwood Hills Community Club (BWHCC) also owns the park and pool in the center of Brookwood Hills.

History and development

Brookwood Hills was the creation of the Burdett family.  Benjamin first created the neighborhood on the Battlefield of Peachtree Creek owned by himself and local Thomas Collier.  The streets were built in accordance to the hilly terrain, instead of grid form, as was popular at the time.  Mr. Burdett planted oak saplings during Brookwood Hills' founding, which now stand tall and are the trademark quality of the neighborhood.  The area developed by Benjamin and Arthur Burdett is now registered as the Brookwood Hills Historic District.

In November 2011 the City of Atlanta began a project to repair damaged sidewalks and curbs in front of approximately 50 homes in the neighborhood.

Brookwood Hills Community Club

The hub of the community is the Brookwood Hills Community Club, which includes a park, pool, two pavilions, tennis courts, and basketball goals.  Many neighborhood sponsored events like the Fourth of July parade and the annual Easter egg hunt take place here.

Brookwood Hills Bullfrogs
The Brookwood Hills pool hosts its own swim team. Their mascot is a bullfrog. This team competes in the Atlanta Swim Association summer league. They start practices in late April, and compete through the end of June or beginning of July. Every year, they compete at Georgia Tech for ASA championships. In 2013, Brookwood Hills won the entire meet.

Notable current and past residents
Vern Yip
Kathryn Stockett
Robert Shaw (conductor)
Ed Helms
Patrik Stefan

Schools

Public
Brookwood Hills is covered by Atlanta Public Schools, and is in the school attendance district of:
E. Rivers Elementary School
Sutton Middle School
North Atlanta High School

Private
Popular private schools in the area include:
Woodward Academy
The Westminster Schools
The Lovett School
Pace Academy
Christ the King Catholic School
The Galloway School
Holy Innocents' Episcopal School
Marist School
Atlanta International School

External links
Brookwood Hills Community Club
Swim League Website
Brookwood Hills Historic District
 Atlanta, Georgia, a National Park Service Discover Our Shared Heritage Travel Itinerary

References

BWHCC website
Brooknotes Newsletter

City of Atlanta Website

Neighborhoods in Atlanta
Historic districts on the National Register of Historic Places in Georgia (U.S. state)
Neoclassical architecture in Georgia (U.S. state)
Bungalow architecture in Georgia (U.S. state)
National Register of Historic Places in Atlanta